Turning the Mind is the second album from Northampton-based band Maps, released in 2009.

Album information
On 22 February 2009 James wrote on his MySpace blog about his new upcoming album, saying "I've never been more confident and excited about this new album". In an interview he posted on the same blog, he mentioned the new album's themes as being "mental states" and "chemicals".

According to an interview on James' new website for Maps, he said Turning the Mind would be darker, angrier and more electronic than his previous album We Can Create. Every two weeks, James posted a song from Turning the Mind onto his MySpace page.

On 11 August the track "Nothing" was uploaded to YouTube accompanied by an unofficial music video.

Turning the Mind was released on 28 September in Europe and 20 October in North America.

The album title track, "Turning the Mind", was featured in the 2010 British film Chatroom.

Track listing

Singles
 "Let Go of the Fear": 11 May 2009
 "I Dream of Crystal": 14 September 2009
 "Die Happy, Die Smiling": 10 January 2010

2009 albums
Maps (musician) albums